Michael J Satz is an American attorney and politician in the State of Florida, who served as State Attorney for Florida's 17th judicial circuit, covering Broward County from 1976 to 2021.

Satz achieved notability in 2022, as lead prosecutor for the trial of the gunman in the Stoneman Douglas High School shooting.

Awards and recognitions
Mr. Satz, who early in his career recognized the needs of victims of crime, instituted a Victim Advocate Unit to provide counseling and assistance to victims. For his efforts, he received the 2004 President’s Award by the Broward Victim’s Rights Coalition.

In 2015, Mr. Satz received Lifetime Achievement Awards from both the B’nai B’rith Justice Unit #5207 and the Broward County Crime Commission. The organization Leadership Broward presented Mr. Satz its annual “Profiles in Leadership” award in 2006. And in 2005, the National Association of Social Workers, Florida Chapter honored him with the local Elected Official of the Year award.

External links

References

Year of birth missing (living people)
Living people
Politicians from Fort Lauderdale, Florida